Borapa also known as Borpa (Village ID 124249) is a small village located 20 km from Mathura in west and about 4 km from the town Sonkh in the state of Uttar Pradesh, India. According to the 2011 census it has a population of 2057 living in 330 households.

References

Villages in Mathura district